Shelly Clark (born July 27, 1947) is an American singer, dancer and actress, best known as a founding member of the 1970s R&B girls group, Honey Cone who had the No. 1 Billboard Hot 100 hit single, "Want Ads" released in March 1971.

Early life
Shelly was born Mashelle Clark in Brooklyn, New York on July 27, 1947. Her mother Lilly Gainen-Clark a Russian Jew was a concert pianist. Her father Edward Evans Clark from Barbados was a self taught dancer singer and entertainer. Clark had an older brother Ilya Clark who was born in 1945. The family moved from Brooklyn to Los Angeles, California in 1957.

Career

Early career
Clark began her career as a dancer, singer and actress at age 6. At age 7 she and her brother were cast in the hit Broadway musical House of Flowers which starred Pearl Bailey and Diahann Carroll. The musical ran every night for 8 months.

Clark and her brother were known as The Clark Kids. Their father became their dance trainer and manager. In 1957, The Clark Kids were signed to Columbia Records as Elia and Michele Clark. They recorded an album entitled Calypso Songs For Children.

In 1957, 9-year-old Clark was cast as part of the Cotton Club Revue of 1957. In the revue, she sang the song "Evalina" and shared the stage with Cab Calloway. Clark was the youngest performer in the cast and the youngest to perform at Palace Theatre and The Apollo in New York. The Cotton Club Revue was a 7-month national tour.

While attending the University of Southern California on a scholarship for talented singers, Clark worked as a session vocalist to make some extra money. During this time Clark was asked to audition for the Ike & Tina Turner Revue in 1966. The audition took place at her home and she was hired on the spot to be an Ikette. Although, Clark never recorded as an Ikette, she did perform with the Revue until a near fatal bus crash in Wichita, Kansas. While Clark was recuperating, new Ikettes were hired and the tour continued without her. After recuperating, Clark was hired as lead dancer to tour with the Little Richard Revue. She also recorded and toured with various artist, including Dusty Springfield on her Canadian tour, and with Bill Medley in Las Vegas.

Clark was a featured singer on the recording "MacArthur Park" by Richard Harris. She also performed with Tom Jones.

Honey Cone
In 1968, Clark met singer Carolyn Willis through long-time industry veteran Sherlie Mae Matthews. The trio formed a girl's group called The Cover Girls and performed in local clubs and theaters.

Singer Edna Wright asked Clark and Willis to appear with her on The Andy Williams Show in 1968. In addition, Wright asked Eddie Holland of the newly formed Invictus Records and formerly of Motown Records to watch the show. Holland was so impressed that he convinced the girls to start a group. He gave the trio the name Honey Cone with Wright as lead singer.

During a break from recording with Honey Cone in Detroit, the group went back to Los Angeles and Clark was hired as a regular on the TV show The Jim Nabors Hour.

In May 1969, Honey Cone's debut single "While You're Out Looking for Sugar" was released on Hot Wax Records. It spent 8 weeks on Billboard'''s R&B chart and peaked at No. 26 on August 16, 1969. The follow-up "Girls, It Ain't Easy" was released in September 1969, and peaked at No. 8 on November 16, 1969 on the R&B chart after appearing for 9 weeks.

In 1971, Clark had to abruptly leave The Jim Nabors Hour when the Honey Cone's single "Want Ads" climbed the charts, knocking The Rolling Stones' "Brown Sugar" out of the No. 1 spot. "Want Ads" proved to be their biggest success, spending 14 weeks on the charts and topping the R&B and Pop charts, and selling over one million copies. It was certified gold by the R.I.A.A. in May 1971. "Stick-Up," which also sold more than one million units, was another No. 1 R&B hit and No. 11 Pop. Honey Cone had further chart success with "One Monkey Don't Stop No Show" (No. 15 Pop, No. 5 R&B) and "The Day I Found Myself" (No. 23 Pop, No. 8 R&B).

Clark along with Wright and Willis appeared on the September 2, 1971 cover of Jet Magazine.

By 1973, Honey Cone had 4 top 40 Billboard Hot 100 hits and 9 top 40 Billboard R&B hits, but the group disbanded that year, starting with Willis who was dissatisfied with the lack of control over her career. Soon after, Hot Wax Records folded.

Post-Honey Cone
In 1973, Mary Wilson of The Supremes asked Clark to join the group following the departures of Jean Terrell and Lynda Laurence. Clark declined citing she "didn't want to do the group thing again." Wilson ended up hiring Clark's label mate Scherrie Payne of the Glass House.

In 1978, Clark was a regular on the disco television show, Hot City, as a singer, dancer and occasional host.

In 1990, the trio attempted a reunion with all three original members, however, that fell apart due to creative differences. .

In 2014, Clark and Wright along with Melodye Perry (Wright's daughter) reunited to perform on the Soul Train Cruise.

On September 18, 2016, Clark and Wright were honored with the 2016 National Rhythm and Blues Music Society Unsung Heroine Award at their Black Tie Gala, Dinner & Awards Ceremony at the Double Tree by Hilton in Philadelphia, PA. Willis, who wasn't in attendance received an award as well.

On September 24, 2017 Clark along with Wright were honored with the Heroes and Legends Award (HAL) in Music as Honey Cone at The Beverly Hill Hotel in Beverly Hills, CA.

On September 12, 2020, Clark's band-mate and friend Edna Wright died at Encino Medical Hospital due to chronic pulmonary issues and suffered a heart attack.

On 8, January 2021, Honey Cone was inducted into the Soul Music Hall Of Fame Class of 2020.

Mayor John Hamilton proclaimed February 1, 2021, Verdine White and Shelly Clark day in Bloomington, Indiana.

Personal life
Clark married Rock and Roll Hall of Famer Verdine White, founding member and bassist of Earth, Wind & Fire, in their Bel Air, California home on December 31, 1980. They have a son and granddaughter.

 Discography 

 Albums 

 1957: Elia and Michele Clark – Calypso Songs for Children (Columbia)

 Backing vocal credits 

 1969: Tommy Roe – Dizzy 1976: Bobby Glenn – Shout It Out 1979: Carrie Lucas – In Danceland''

Honey Cone Discography

Television/Film Credits
1959: The Green Pastures - angel
1968: The Andy Williams Show - back-up singer
1969–1971: The Jim Nabors Hour - regular dancer and singer
1978: Hot City Television Show - singer, dancer and occasional host
1989: CBS Summer Playhouse (TV Series) episode, Coming To America - dialogue coach

Honey Cone TV/Film Credits

References 

1947 births
Musicians from Brooklyn
Dancers from New York (state)
Ike & Tina Turner members
American soul singers
African-American women singers
Columbia Records artists
American musical theatre actresses
Living people